is a member of the Japanese Communist Party serving in the House of Representatives. He was criticized for his remarks calling the budget for the Japan Self-Defense Forces money to "kill people".

References

Japanese communists
Japanese Communist Party politicians
Living people
Year of birth missing (living people)